The University of Applied Sciences and Arts of Southern Switzerland  (SUPSI) is one of the Universities of Applied Sciences of the Swiss Confederation.
SUPSI offers more than 30 bachelor and master courses, complementing theoretical scientific knowledge and practical technological advances applied to real projects.
Various departments of SUPSI are mainly based in Southern Switzerland. Instruction is mainly in Swiss Italian, with some courses delivered in English and German.

History 
SUPSI was established on 11 March 1997 by Canton Ticino and it received federal recognition in 2003. The new institution integrates preexisting specialized schools and public and private research institutes which date back to 1852 with the Cantonal High School initiated by Carlo Cattaneo and providing higher education courses in mechanics and architecture.

In 1997 SUPSI integrates within its new organization:
 STS Electronic Engineering Section (established in Manno in 1993)
 SSQEA College for Financial and Administrative Managers (established by Canton Ticino in 1987 as a third cycle following the commercial schools)
 SSAA College of Applied Arts (established by Canton Ticino in Lugano in 1985 as a third cycle of the CSIA Educational Centre for Artistic Industry)
 ICIMSI Institute of Computer Integrated Manufacturing of Southern Switzerland (established in Manno in 1992 as a private-public initiative to develop applied research in support of industry)
 ICTS the Cantonal Experimental Technical Institution
 the Cantonal Office of Geology and Hydrology which becomes the Institute of Earth Science (IST).
In 1997 SUPSI is divided into four departments: Construction and Territory, Computer Science and Electronic Engineering, Applied Art and Business Administration.

In the following years other specialized schools and public and private research institutes were integrated:
 1998 College of Social Work (established by Canton Ticino) becomes a department.
 1999 IDSIA Dalle Molle Institute for Artificial Intelligence Research (established in Lugano in 1988); it is jointly run by Università della Svizzera italiana and SUPSI thanks to an agreement between the two institutions.
 2004 Fernfachhochshule Schweiz (FFHS) based in Brig and with training centers in Basel, Bern and Zurich.
 2006 Conservatorio della Svizzera italiana - Scuola Universitaria di Musica (Conservatory of Southern Switzerland/Ticino Music Conservatory)
 2006 Accademia Teatro Dimitri (established in 1975 by the Swiss clown Dimitri as a school of movement theatre).
 2007 Phsyiotherapie Graubünden (based in Landquart); Bachelor in Physiotherapy affiliated to the Department of Health Sciences.
 2011 MAInD; Master of Arts in Interaction Design.

Organization and administration 
As a Swiss University of Applied Sciences (Fachhochschule, Haute école specialisée, scuola universitaria professionale), SUPSI is an autonomous organization, and it has a university status with a focus on professional training and applied research.
Its four institutional mandates are first and second level university education (bachelor's degree and master's degree), continuing education, applied research and consulting and support services to businesses and institutions.

The governance of SUPSI is based on:
 SUPSI Council is composed of members nominated by the State Council of Canton Ticino and it has a mandate of strategic direction and control.
 SUPSI Board
 University administration includes the director, the head of shared services and the directors and deans of the departments and the associated schools.
 Departments and associated schools
 Consultative commissions. Each department and associated school has a Consultative Commission appointed by the SUPSI Board.

From a financial point of view, SUPSI is supported by Ticino cantonal contributions, contributions from the Swiss Confederation and is self-financing. The support of Canton Ticino is regulated by a performance contract based on the number of students enrolled and on the volume of projects acquired.

Departments and associated schools 
SUPSI is organized in departments and associated schools. The associated schools are managed by private institutions, and they are integrated within SUPSI general administration. Departments include institutes, laboratories, and centres of expertise; they are organized in academic disciplines.

Due to the progressive integration of preexisting specialized schools and public and private research institutes, the structure of the departments changes through time

Department for Environment, Constructions and Design 

 Institute for Materials and Constructions
 Institute of Earth Sciences
 Institute for Applied Sustainability to the Built Environment
 Laboratory of Visual Culture
 Laboratory of Applied Microbiology

Department of Business Economics, Health and Social Care 

The departments works in basic training, continuing education, research and services.
 Inno3 Competence Centre
 Tax Law Competence Centre
 Laboratory of methodology and statistics
 Medical Humanities Centre

Department of Innovative Technologies 

The focus of the Department of Innovative Technologies is applied engineering sciences in the industrial sector, technological and IT services for both educational and research purposes.
Within the department there are:
 Institute CIM (Computer Integrated Manufacturing) for Sustainable Innovation.
 AI Lab IDSIA Institute Dalle Molle for Artificial Intelligence.
 Institute for Information Systems and Networking
 Institute for Systems and Applied Electronics
 Institute of Systems and Technologies for Sustainable Production

Department of Teaching and Learning 

The department works in education, research and services.

Associated schools 
 Accademia Teatro Dimitri
 Conservatorio della Svizzera italiana
 Fernfachhochschule Schweiz

Campus 
SUPSI is located in southern Switzerland, in cantons Ticino, Valais and Graubünden.

Academics 
The first SUPSI diplomas are awarded in 2000 in architecture, civil engineering, computer science, electronic engineering, interior design, visual communication, conservation and restoration, business administration and social work. In 2001 the Canton Ticino Chamber of Commerce for Industry and Craftsmanship, the Association of Ticino Industries, the Ticino Banking Association and by Ticino Section Swiss Construction Companies establish the Ticino Economy Prize (Premio dell'Economia Ticinese) for the best SUPSI graduates; in 2011 the Prize Talenthesis is established.

Undergraduate programme (Bachelor's degree)

Graduate programme (Master's degree)

Continuing education 
SUPSI provides further trainings and qualifications:
 Master of Advanced Studies (MAS)
 Executive Master of Business Administration (EMBA)
 Diploma of Advanced Studies (DAS)
 Certificate of Advanced Studies (CAS)

Research 
A research service is co-managed by SUPSI and Università della Svizzera italiana.

Notes and references

See also 

 Education in Switzerland
 List of universities in Switzerland
 List of largest universities by enrollment in Switzerland

External links

 The University of Applied Sciences and Arts of Southern Switzerland on the official website of Lugano

Universities of Applied Sciences in Switzerland
Lugano
Schools in the canton of Ticino
Educational institutions established in 1997
1997 establishments in Switzerland
SUPSI